This article lists orbital and suborbital launches during the first half of the year 2023.

For all other spaceflight activities, see 2023 in spaceflight. For launches in the second half of 2023, see List of spaceflight launches in July–December 2023.



Orbital launches 

|colspan=8 style="background:white;"|

January 
|-

|colspan=8 style="background:white;"|

February 
|-

|colspan=8 style="background:white;"|

March 
|-

 

|colspan=8 style="background:white;"|

April 
|-

|colspan=8 style="background:white;"|

May 
|-

|colspan=8 style="background:white;"|

June 
|-

|colspan=8 style="background:white;"| 
|-
|colspan=8 style="background:white;"| 
|}

Suborbital flights 

 

|}

Notes

References

External links 

2023 in spaceflight
Spaceflight by year
Spaceflight